Daniel López López (born October 26, 1949) is a Mexican luchador (professional wrestler) and trainer, best known under the ring name El Satánico (Spanish for "The Satanic One"). He was originally an enmascarado (masked wrestler), but lost the mask early in his career and has performed unmasked ever since. The majority of his in-ring career was spent in Consejo Mundial de Lucha Libre (CMLL), where he worked as a rudo (the antagonists also known as heel in professional wrestling lingo).

El Satánico was one of the main members of the Los Infernales ("The Infernal Ones") stable from its creation in the early 1980s through 2008 and was a member of every single incarnation of the group. Los Infernales won the CMLL World Trios Championship three times and the Mexican National Trios Championship three times. He's also won the CMLL World Middleweight Championship, CMLL World Welterweight Championship once, the Mexican National Middleweight Championship three times, the NWA World Light Heavyweight Championship four times, and the NWA World Middleweight Championship five times in his career.

For years López worked at the CMLL wrestling school, playing a part in the development of almost every wrestler that worked for CMLL in the 2000s. He later opened his own school independent of CMLL. He wrestles on a reduced schedule on the Mexican independent circuit.

Professional wrestling career

Early career (1973–1986)
López made his professional wrestling debut on June 17, 1973, using the name El Satánico Dr. No ("The Satanic Dr. No") named after the James Bond movie villain Dr. No. A short time later, the name was shortened to just "El Satánico". He was originally an enmascarado, or masked character, but lost his mask as a result of a Lucha de Apuesta, or "bet match" against El Vengador on January 4, 1974, and never allowed to wrestle wearing the mask again as a result of the Lucha de Apuestas stipulation. On October 19, 1979, Satánico won his first wrestling championship when he defeated Cachorro Mendoza to win the Mexican National Middleweight Championship. His first reign lasted 161 days and was an indicator of what the future held for Satánico as it was the first of many titles he would hold. Satánico held the Mexican National Middleweight title again in 1981-1982 and would hold it in 1988/1989 as well. On March 28, 1980, Satánico moved up from the Mexican title to the world title as he defeated Satoru Sayama for the NWA World Middleweight Championship. While his first reign lasted just 30 days he would hold it a further two times between 1982 and 1983 by defeating César Curiel and El Jalisco for the title, before losing it for the third and final time to Lizmark on June 3, 1986. A month after losing the Middleweight title Satánico moved from the Middleweight division to the light heavyweight division when he defeated Ringo Mendoza to win his first NWA World Light Heavyweight Championship, holding it for 87 days before Mendoza regained it.

Los Infernales (1986-1999)

In the early 1980s, the Trios concept became very popular in Mexico, spearheaded by the trio called Los Misioneros de Muerte (the Missionaries of Death) who worked for rival promotion Universal Wrestling Association (UWA). EMLL decided to create a trio of villains, or Rudos as they're called in Lucha Libre, to capitalize on the popularity of the Trios phenomenon. MS-1, El Satánico and Espectro Jr. were chosen to form Los Infernales (the Infernals). Due to various injuries Espectro Jr. was forced to retire from wrestling altogether, which led to Pirata Morgan becoming the third Infernales, giving birth to the most successful incarnation of Los Infernales. Satánico split his time between trios matches and wrestling in the middleweight division, defeating Lizmark to start his fourth reign on December 2, 1983. By the middle of 1984 Satánico became involved in a long, draw out heated feud with Gran Cochisse, a feud that saw Sátanico and Cochisse trade the title back and forth. On October 14, 1984, Satánico won the UWA World Middleweight Championship from Súper Astro.

In March 1985 Los Infernales participated in a tournament to determine the first-ever Mexican National Trios Champions; in the finals of the tournament, Los Infernales defeated Los Brazos ("the Arms"; El Brazo, Brazo de Oro, and Brazo de Plata) to become the first Mexican National Trios champions. In October 1986, Pirata Morgan left the group to form a new group called "Los Bucaneros", in his place Los Infernales recruited Masakre to be their third member. While MS-1 and Masakre worked as a tag team, Satánico focused more and more on singles competition, which meant that Los Infernales made fewer appearances as a trio. During this time period. Satánico won his third Mexican National Middleweight title as well as his second and third NWA World Light Heavyweight Championship. During this time Satánico and Pirata Morgan were embroiled in a long feud, pitting the former Infernales members against each other. The feud saw Morgan win the NWA World Light Heavyweight Championship from Satánico on October 21, 1989.

In the early 1990s, Los Infernales reformed, reuniting MS-1, Satánico, and Pirata Morgan once more. The trio participated in the tournament to crown the inaugural CMLL World Trios Champions. Los Infernales won the tournament, defeating Los Brazo in the finals to become the CMLL World Trios Champions on November 22, 1991. Former Infernales member Masakre had formed his own group, Los Intocables (the Untouchables) consisting of himself, Pierroth Jr. and Jaque Mate ("Checkmate"). Los Intocables were immediately paired against Los Infernales to create a Rudos vs. Rudos storyline, playing off both the championship chase and the history between the two groups. On March 22, 1992, Los Intocables won the CMLL World Trios Title, however, Los Infernales got the final victory in their feud as they defeated Los Intocables for the championship on September 20, 1992. On April 5, 1992, Satánico defeated longtime rival Lizmark to win his fourth and final NWA World Light Heavyweight Championship. His final reign with the title lasted 111 days until Apolo Dantés beat him for it. 

In 1994 Satánico gained a measure of revenge on Apolo Dantés as he won the CMLL World Middleweight Championship from Dantés. With the win, Satánico became one of the few people to have held both the Mexican National, NWA World, and CMLL World championship in the Middleweight division. Satánico would go on to hold the CMLL Middleweight title for a total of 1,561 days, by far the longest reign of any CMLL World Middleweight Champion. On March 21, 1997, Satánico won his third CMLL World Trios title, this time teaming up with Rey Bucanero (the nephew of Pirata Morgan) and Emilio Charles Jr. to win the vacant titles in a one-night eight-team tournament. The trio only held the title for 39 days before they were defeated by La Ola Azur ("The Blue Wave"; Atlantis, Lizmark and Mr. Niebla). In mid-1997 Frontier Martial-Arts Wrestling (FMW) wrestler Taka Michinoku toured Mexico to gain international experience. On June 20, 1997, Satánico defeated Michinoku to win the FMW Independent World Junior Heavyweight Championship. He would hold the title until August 25, 1997, where Michinoku won it back shortly before returning to Japan. On March 7, 1999 Satánico's marathon reign as CMLL world middleweight champion ended when his old rival Ringo Mendoza won the title from him.

Los Nuevos Infernales (1999-2009)

In the late 1990s, Satánico reformed Los Infernales, recruiting Rey Bucanero and Último Guerrero to form Los Nuevos Infernales (the new Infernals). The Trio won the Copa de Arena Mexico Tournament in 1999, but did not win any titles. After working together for just under a year Bucanero and Guerrero turned on Satánico, kicking him out of Los Nuevos Infernales, replacing him with Tarzan Boy. Satánico formed his own "Infernales" with Averno and Mephisto. When Tarzan Boy was injured Los Nuevos Infernales brought in Máscara Mágica to bolster the group. The storyline between Los Infernales and Los Nuevos Infernales came to a head when the two teams, seven men in total, faced off in a steel cage match where the winners would earn the right to the name "Los Infernales" and the last man in the cage would lose either his mask or his hair. On September 28, 2001, Satánico's team won the right to the Infernales name and forced Máscara Mágica to unmask. After losing the match Guerrero, Bucanero and Tarzan Boy became known collectively as Los Guerreros del Infierno (The Infernal Soldiers). 

On June 23, 2002, Satánico, Averno and Mephisto defeated the trio of Mr. Niebla, Olímpico and Safari to win the Mexican National Trios Championship. Los Infernales would only hold the Trios title for approximately 3 months before losing it to La Familia de Tijuana (Damián 666, Halloween and Nicho el Millonario). Averno and Mephisto turned on Satánico shortly after the title loss and formed their own group known as La Triada del Terror (the trio of terror) along with Ephesto. On November 25, 2003, El Satánico won the last championship of his long career when he defeated El Felino to win the CMLL World Welterweight Championship. Satánico held the title until February 24, 2004, when his former protégé Mephisto defeated him for the belt.

In 2007 Satánico reformed Los Infernales once more, teaming up with young wrestlers that had recently been repackaged to more "hellish" images, Nosferatu and Euforia. The trios did not approach the success of the previous incarnations of Los Infernales, working mainly lower to mid-card matches; the group was intended to give the two young wrestlers more ring experience and further their training under Satánico's guidance. The following year, Virus became the unofficial leader of Los Nuevos Infernales, as Satánico reduced his actual in-ring work.

El Satanico wrestles a couple of times per month as of January 2022 at age 72.

Late career (2009–present)
In 2009, Satánico announced that he was reducing the number of shows he worked to focus on his work at CMLL's wrestling school. On March 2, 2012, he wrestled El Solar to a draw in a match for the FLLM Master Championship, which meant that El Solar retained the title. In 2014 he lost a Lucha de Apuestas match to El Dandy as part of El Dandy' retirement tour. After having worked on the independent circuit from 2012 through 2014, El Satánico returned to CMLL by the end of 2014, splitting his time between CMLL and appearing on independent shows. For CMLL's 2019 Leyendas Mexicanas show, El Satánico defeated El Solar on CMLL's annual tribute to lucha libre legends show.

Professional wrestling trainer
Daniel López is considered one of the best wrestling trainers currently active in Mexico, following in the footsteps of his own mentor Diablo Velasco. He is the head trainer for CMLL's wrestling school in Guadalajara, Jalisco, Mexico (Gimnasio del Diablo Velasco) and thus has been involved in training a lot of the wrestlers CMLL employs as well as students who have gone on to work for other promotions around the world. The following is a list of notable wrestlers López has trained:

La Amapola
Ángel Azteca Jr.
Ángel de Oro
Ángel de Plata/Niebla Roja
Arkangel de la Muerte
Axel
Averno
Bam Bam
Cancerbero / Mesalla
Demus 3:16/Pequeño Damián 666
Dragón Rojo Jr.
Doctor X
Eléctrico
Ephesto
Esfinge
Euforia
Fabián el Gitano
Guerrero Maya Jr.
Hooligan /Luciferno
Horus
Lady Apache
Lluvia
Loco Max
Marcela
Máscara Dorada/Gran Metalik
Misterioso II
Nitro
Nosferatu
Okumura
Palacio Negro
Pegasso
Pequeño Nitro
Pequeño Violencia
Princesa Sujey
Psycho Clown
Puma King
Raziel / Caligula
Rey Cometa
Rey Escorpión
El Sagrado
Semental/Black Taurus
Sensei
Silueta
Soberano Jr.
La Sombra / Andrade
Stuka Jr.
Super Nova
El Terrible
Texano Jr.
Tiger
Tigre Blanco
Titán
Tritón / Rey Tritón
Trueno
Veneno
Volador Jr.
Zeuxis

Championships and accomplishments
Empresa Mexicana de la Lucha Libre / Consejo Mundial de Lucha Libre
CMLL World Middleweight Championship (1 time)
CMLL World Trios Championship (3 times) – with MS-1 and Pirata Morgan (2), Emilio Charles Jr. and Rey Bucanero (1)
CMLL World Welterweight Championship (1 time)
Mexican National Middleweight Championship (3 times)
Mexican National Trios Championship (3 times) – with MS-1 and Pirata Morgan (2) and Mephisto and Averno (1)
NWA World Light Heavyweight Championship (4 times)
NWA World Middleweight Championship (5 times)
Frontier Martial-Arts Wrestling
FMW Independent World Junior Heavyweight Championship (1 time)
International Wrestling Revolution Group
Copa Higher Power (1999) – with Astro Rey Jr., Máscara Mágica, Rey Bucanero and Último Guerrero
Pro Wrestling Illustrated
Ranked No. 74 of the 500 best singles wrestlers in the PWI 500 in 1997
Ranked No. 182 of the 500 best singles wrestlers during the PWI Years in 2003
Universal Wrestling Association
UWA World Middleweight Championship (1 time)
Wrestling Observer Newsletter awards
Wrestling Observer Newsletter Hall of Fame (Class of 2001)

Luchas de Apuestas record

Notes

References

1949 births
Living people
Mexican male professional wrestlers
Professional wrestlers from Jalisco
People from Guadalajara, Jalisco
Professional wrestling trainers
20th-century professional wrestlers
21st-century professional wrestlers
Mexican National Middleweight Champions
Mexican National Trios Champions
CMLL World Middleweight Champions
CMLL World Trios Champions
CMLL World Welterweight Champions
NWA World Light Heavyweight Champions
NWA World Middleweight Champions
Independent World Junior Heavyweight Champions
UWA World Middleweight Champions